Bassel al-Assad (23 March 1962 – 21 January 1994) was a Syrian engineer, colonel, equestrian and politician who was the eldest son of Syrian President Hafez al-Assad and the older brother of (later) President Bashar al-Assad. It was widely expected that he would succeed his father as President of Syria until he died in a car accident in 1994.

Early life and education
Bassel al-Assad was born on 23 March 1962. He was trained as a civil engineer, and he held a PhD in military sciences. He mentioned growing up:

Career
Trained in parachuting, he was commissioned in the Special Forces and later switched to the armoured corps after training in the Soviet Military Academies. He rapidly progressed through the ranks, becoming a major and then commander of a brigade in the Republican Guard.

After his father recovered from a serious illness in 1984, Bassel began to accompany him and he emerged on the national scene in 1987, when he won several equestrian medals at a regional tournament. The Ba'ath Party press in Syria eulogised him as the "Golden Knight" because of his prowess on horseback. He also had a reputation for an interest in fast cars, and his friends described him as charismatic and commanding. Assad was soon appointed Head of Presidential Security. In addition, he launched the Syrian Computer Society in 1989, which was later headed by Bashar.

Originally Assad's uncle, Rifaat al-Assad, was Hafez's chosen successor but Rifaat attempted to usurp power from Hafez while the latter was in a coma in 1984. This led to Rifaat's exile. Following the incident, Bassel was groomed to succeed his father. Hafez's efforts intensified to make Bassel the next President of Syria in the early 1990s; after Hafez's election victory in 1991, the President was publicly referred to as "Abu Basil" (Father of Bassel). Assad was also being introduced to European and Arab leaders; he was a close friend of the children of King Hussein of Jordan, especially Haya bint Hussein who also enjoyed equestrianism, and had been also introduced to King Fahd of Saudi Arabia.

Assad had a significant role in Lebanese affairs, and was known to Lebanese leaders of all sects. He organised a highly publicised anti-corruption campaign within the government and frequently appeared in full military uniform at official receptions to signal the government's commitment to the armed forces.

Former CIA director Michael Hayden has compared Bassel to Sonny Corleone in the novel The Godfather. "There is no doubt the Assads, along with the Makhloufs who are tied to them in bonds of marriage and partnerships, were just as busy with crime and committing particularly cruel acts as they were with ruling over Syria."

Personal life
Bassel is said to have spoken French and Russian fluently. According to leaked United States diplomatic cables, he had a relationship with a Lebanese woman, Siham Asseily who later married Lebanese journalist and deputy Gebran Tueni.

His older sister, Bushra, could not marry Assef Shawkat until his death, as he rejected that marriage.

Death and burial
On 21 January 1994, while he was driving his Mercedes at a high speed (author Paul Theroux reports Bassel was driving at  through fog to Damascus International Airport for a flight to Frankfurt, Germany on his way to a ski vacation in the Alps in the early hours of the morning, Bassel collided with a barrier and, not wearing a seatbelt, died instantly. Hafez Makhlouf was with him and was hospitalized with injuries after the accident, and a chauffeur in the back seat was unhurt.

Assad's body was taken to Al Assad University Hospital and then buried in Qardaha, where his father's body was also later buried.

Legacy
After his death, shops, schools and public offices in Syria closed, and the sale of alcohol was suspended in respect. He was elevated by the state into "the martyr of the country, the martyr of the nation and the symbol for its youth".

A great number of squares and streets were named after him. The new international swimming complex, various hospitals, sporting clubs and a military academy were named after him. The international airport in Latakia was named after him, Bassel Al-Assad International Airport. His statue is found in several Syrian cities, and even after his death, he is often pictured on billboards with his father and brother. He also has an equestrian statue in Aleppo, and formerly in Chtaura, Lebanon.

On 17 November 2020, a museum dedicated to him was inaugurated at the Latakia Sports City.

Bassel Assad's death led to his lesser-known brother Bashar al-Assad, who was then undertaking postgraduate training in ophthalmology in London, assuming the mantle of president-in-waiting. Bashar became President following the death of his father, on 10 June 2000. Bassel Assad's posters and his name were also used to secure a smooth transition after Hafez Assad introduced the slogan "Bassel, the Example; Bashar, the Future."

References

External links

 The death of Bassel al Assad BBC World Service Witness episode

20th-century engineers
1962 births
1994 deaths
Arab Socialist Ba'ath Party – Syria Region politicians
Bassel al
Sons of national leaders
Damascus University alumni
Road incident deaths in Syria
Syrian colonels
Syrian civil engineers